49th Street station is a SEPTA Regional Rail station in Philadelphia. It is located at 1104 South 49th Street in the Kingsessing section of Southwest Philadelphia, and serves the Media/Wawa Line. In 2013, this station saw 62 boardings and 52 alightings on an average weekday.

The station is a sheltered shed that sits on one platform; the other platform has a ramp to the Chester Avenue bridge. The station is handicapped-accessible. Chester Avenue carries the SEPTA Route 13 trolley, which is part of the Subway-Surface Trolley system. The trolleys use an alternate track embedded in 49th Street when the tunnels are closed. 49th Street station is also served by SEPTA bus route 64 which serves 50th and Parkside Avenue going north and Pier 70 Shopping Plaza going south. 

The Media/Wawa line was originally the main line of the West Chester and Philadelphia Railroad, laid in 1852-53. There has been a station at this location since at least 1886, when the line was owned by the Philadelphia, Wilmington and Baltimore Railroad.

Station layout
49th Street has two low-level side platforms.

References

External links

SEPTA: 49th Street Station
Chester Avenue entrance from Google Maps Street View
"Around 49th and Springfield Avenue". 1938 aerial photo of the station and nearly Kingsessing Recreation Center.

SEPTA Regional Rail stations
Stations on the West Chester Line
Railway stations in Philadelphia
Former Pennsylvania Railroad stations
Railway stations in the United States opened in 1886